General Motors is a former Rochester Industrial and Rapid Transit Railway station and streetcar carhouse located next to the Rochester Products Division in Rochester, New York. It opened in 1937 as a one-stop extension from the former terminus at Driving Park, and was closed in 1956 along with the rest of the line. The maintenance buildings still stand.

References

Railway stations in Rochester, New York
Railway stations in the United States opened in 1918
Railway stations closed in 1956
1918 establishments in New York (state)
1956 disestablishments in New York (state)